The National Movement for the Salvation of the Fatherland (Nacionalno Dviženie za Spasenie na Otecestvoto) is a nationalist political party in Bulgaria.

History
It was officially registered on 18 June 2003, chaired by Elijah Kirov.
In the parliamentary elections in 2005 the party participated in National Union Attack, which won 8.14% of the vote (296,848 votes) and 21 members. On 7 June 2009 the new party president Todor Rashev submit an application to participate in the parliamentary elections, which is supported by the signatures of 17,130 voters. The party left Attack which is currently a single party. In the parliamentary elections held in 2009 the party won 0.04% of the vote (1,784 votes).

Nationalist parties in Bulgaria